Bishnu Prasad Rabha was an cultural figure from Assam, known for his contributions in the fields of music, dance, painting, literature as well as political activism. As an advocate of people's cultural movement, he drew heavily from different genres of classical and folk cultural traditions. Considered a doyen of the Culture of Assam, the Assamese people affectionately call him Kalaguru (meaning: "the master of the arts"). He is also called by Marxists as Sainik Silpi (sainik "soldier", silpi "artist") for his active participation in the armed struggle, led by the Revolutionary Communist Party of India (RCPI).

Early life

Bishnu Prasad Rabha was born in Dacca, Bengal Presidency, British India on 31 January 1909. His mother's name was Gethi Mech and father's name was Raibahadur Gopal Chandra Mushahary, who was working as a police under British regime. He was born to a Bodo family, but since he was raised by a Rabha family, he adopted 'Rabha' surname. Bishnu Rabha attended Tezpur Government High School and later went to Calcutta for higher education. He completed his ISC exam from St. Paul's Cathedral Mission College and joined the Ripon College (now Surendranath College) at the University of Calcutta for a BSc degree.

From an early stage, he played an active role in the struggle for Indian Independence. He came to be influenced by left wing ideas and came closer to the Communist Party of India. However, when Germany attacked Soviet Union during second world war and the Indian communists decided to work with the British government, a section of the party favored a different approach – to oppose British imperialism and European fascism simultaneously. So, a split happened in the communist party and in 1945 he finally joined the Revolutionary Communist Party of India (RCPI). In 1951, after the death of Jyoti Prasad Agarwala, he became the president of the Assam branch of Indian People's Theatre Association (IPTA).

His work Bano Kobang portrays the life worlds of various indigenous Assamese communities of Assam. His other works include Missing Coneng, Sonpahi, Axomiya Kristir Hamuh Abhakh, and Atit Axom. His interest for the upliftment and liberation of the weaker sections of society is visible in his works. Rabha was an eminent freedom fighter. His meaning of freedom however is not simply freedom from British rule. But it meant freedom from capitalism, freedom from wage-slavery, freedom from poverty and all social evils. In his own words, "I am fighting for a revolution from the realm of necessity to the realm of freedom". He dedicated his entire life for this freedom movement.

He donated an ancestral estate of 2500 bigha land received from the British government in favor of the peasants. His slogan was "Haal Jaar Maati Taar" means "those who cultivate should own the land". The present day Tezpur University stands upon the land donated by him. His entire life was characterized by a restlessness to work for the people, and he kept on moving around like a nomad. He was also an excellent mass mobiliser. His speeches and lectures could touch the heart of the masses. However, his political struggle was never ended with individual power and seeking motive. It was only to give power at the hands of the masses. He even said that the independence achieved in 1947 was simply a farce. It is because in spite of the freedom the poor and weaker sections of the society that remained the same and Assam did not get independence from colonial India as sovereign Assam was not established. According to him, the real struggle begins after 1947.

Apart from being a revolutionary, he was also worked as an academician and researcher. This was despite the fact that due to participation in freedom struggle he was forced by the British colonial regime to leave Ripon College at Calcutta and he transferred to Victoria College (now Acharya Brojendra Nath Seal College) at Cooch Bihar. He was not able to continue with his formal studies even there, due to frequent raids conducted by the police against his hostel and was compelled to give up his formal educational career forever.

Cultural influence

The level of influence exerted by the Kala Guru can be observed through the fact that most cultural music competitions of Assam feature a segment called Bishnu Rava Sangeet related to his compositions, lyrics and verse. Bishnu Prasad was an established singer. He had learnt Borgeet of Shrimanta Shankar Deva and gave the genre a new significance for the modern times. There are more than hundred songs composed by him. His songs are collectively called as Bishnu Rava Sangeet. This was a new genre of Assamese. In his songs one can see diverse themes like tributes to the Mother Nature, the exploitation of the peasant masses by the colonial rulers, the revolts of the workers at tea industries etc. His songs also reflect his revolutionary ideal and the country's struggle for real freedom. Some of his songs are popular among children even today and will be, for all times to come. Some leading numbers include Xurore Deulore, Bilote Halise, etc. He advocated the need to be aware of other people's cultures, views, religions, etc., and advocated for a world community.

His compositions include song like Para jonomor khubho logonor, logon ukali gol, roi roi keteki, tilai tilai, kurua botah and many more to mention. He was a great actor. He used to perform dramas at Baan theatre of Tezpur which is regarded to be one of the oldest cultural activity centers of Assam. He also translated the famous song of revolution "Internationale" by Eugène Pottier into Assamese. His paintings are still preserved in his residence at Tezpur.

Theatre
There have been many live performances at the Baan theatre in Tezpur which is famously connected to Bishnu Rava. This theatre (Ban Stage) where many of Bishnu Rabha's plays have been staged is designed by renowned architect Upendra Kumar Baruah.

Films
He was also recognized as a film director, music composer (Siraj) and actor (Era Bator Sur). He was an actor par excellence. His acting expertise was witnessed by Ban Theatre of Tezpur. But he never used this talent for commercial purpose. In spite of having very good rapport with the art world of Kolkata and Bombay, he never left Assam to achieve commercial success in the field of acting. Rather he used his talent to educate the masses. This talent also helped him to move around in disguise during his days of struggle. He also assisted in making of the first Assamese film Joymoti, by Jyoti Prasad Agarwala. He was also a recognized film director.

Recognition and awards
Rabha's songs are recognized as 'Rabha Sangeet'.

There is an award given in his honor for achievements in the cultural/music world of Assam by the state government.

Kalaguru Bishnu Rabha Award 2016

The relevance of the ideals of Kalaguru Bishnu Prasad Rabha, the musical and artistic genius who transcended man-made barriers to unite diverse communities was remembered on the occasion of his death anniversary by Assam. The Bishnu Rabha Award for 2016 were also presented on Monday to well-known artist Girish Chandra Bora and prominent Kathak exponent Bipul Das at a function organized at Rabindra Bhawan in Guwahati by the Directorate of Cultural Affairs.

The award carrying Rs 100,000 each, a citation and other gifts was presented to the distinguished personalities by Chief Minister Sarbananda Sonowal.

Acknowledging the role of the cultural brigade in nation building, Sonowal announced that in the coming days the government would come up with a special policy for the welfare of the artistes. He also assured that Rabindra Bhawan would be developed and within a few months the auditorium will provide a new experience to performers and viewers alike. Stressing the need to promote the ideals of the Kalaguru among the young generation, Sonowal said that by imbibing the humanistic values that Bishnu Prasad Rabha stood for, Assam can be propelled on the road towards real development. Sonowal also laid importance on holistic development of the youth so that they can bring the desired changes with their work culture and commitment.

In his acceptance speech, Girish Chandra Bora said that the honor conferred on him will motivate him to continue with his work with greater zeal. He said that an artist never works with the intention of bagging an award or a favor but creates for the satisfaction of his heart. He also added that the literary and cultural contributions of the revolutionary Bishnu Prasad Rabha have always been an inspiration for him. On the other hand, speaking on the occasion, sarod maestro Amjad Ali Khan recalled the multifaceted personality of the Kalaguru, particularly his patriotism and cultural leanings, and said that music is an important aspect of life, and it does not belong to any religion.

Memorial Park

The Bishnu Rabha Smriti Udyan has been set up as a memorial park in his honor. It is located on the banks of the Brahmaputra near Tezpur in a plot adjacent to the Bhairabi Temple.

The park is a result of the hard work of his middle son Hemraj Rabha who took the initiative to pay tribute to his father and started the construction. The project was later on taken by the government of Assam. It contains the cremation spot of the maestro. Apart from it, many of his unforgettable works are sculpted into the walls. The cremation spot lies on the bank of the Brahmaputra as a result of which it was suffering from soil erosion. But now it has been provided with embankments to prevent it and preserve it. Nowadays it has become a major site of attraction for his devotees. People often visit this place to offer homage.

See also
 Assamese cinema
 Culture of Assam

References

External links

Musicians from Assam
Assamese actors
People from Sonitpur district
Indian male songwriters
Tezpur
1969 deaths
1909 births
St. Paul's Cathedral Mission College alumni
Surendranath College alumni
University of Calcutta alumni
Assamese-language poets
Poets from Assam
Assam dramatists and playwrights
20th-century Indian poets
20th-century Indian dramatists and playwrights
20th-century Indian musicians
People from Dhaka
Bodo people
20th-century Bangladeshi musicians
20th-century Bangladeshi writers
Dramatists and playwrights from Assam
20th-century Bangladeshi male writers
20th-century male musicians